Burgdorf railway station is a railway station in the municipality of Burgdorf, in the Swiss canton of Bern. It sits at the junction of three the standard gauge railway lines: the Olten–Bern line of Swiss Federal Railways and the Burgdorf–Thun and Solothurn–Langnau lines of BLS AG.

Services 
The following services stop at Burgdorf:

References

External links 
 
 

Railway stations in the canton of Bern
Swiss Federal Railways stations